John James Cole (1874 – 24 May 1959) was an Irish politician, farmer and auctioneer.

Early and personal life
Born in Kinnegar, Holywood, County Down in 1874. He married Jeanie Jones in 1909, and they had one son and two daughters.

Cole studied at the Sullivan Upper School in Holywood. He entered business after leaving school. He moved to Cavan town to establish a pharmacy; he later became an auctioneer, land agent, farmer and cattle breeder.

Politics
He was first elected to Dáil Éireann as an independent Teachta Dála (TD) for the Cavan constituency at the 1923 general election. He lost his seat at the June 1927 general election but regained it at the September 1927 general election. He again lost his seat at the 1932 general election and was an unsuccessful candidate at the 1933 general election. He was elected again at the 1937 general election and was re-elected at the 1938 and 1943 general elections. He again lost his seat at the 1944 general election and was an unsuccessful candidate at the 1948, 1951, 1954 and 1957 general elections.

A prominent unionist before 1922, he was a member of the Orange Order and was grand master of the County Cavan lodge. In 1937, he said "those whom I represent ... you can call them ex-Unionists, or, if you wish to be more precise, you can call them Protestants".

His son John Copeland Cole was a Senator from 1957 to 1969. His brother Thomas Loftus Cole, was an MP for Belfast East.

He died in Belturbet in 1959.

See also
Families in the Oireachtas

References

1874 births
1959 deaths
Independent TDs
Members of the 4th Dáil
Members of the 6th Dáil
Members of the 9th Dáil
Members of the 10th Dáil
Members of the 11th Dáil
Politicians from County Cavan
People from County Down
Irish farmers